Seandun GAA is a Gaelic football and hurling division in the city of Cork, Ireland. It is one of eight divisions of Cork County Board. It organizes competitions for the clubs within the division, at adult level. The winners of these competitions compete against other divisional champions to determine which club is the county champion. In addition, the division selects football and hurling teams from the adult teams playing at junior level or county intermediate level, and these then compete for the Cork Senior Football Championship and Cork Senior Hurling Championship. Many of the best known clubs in Cork are part of this division - Nemo Rangers, Blackrock, Glen Rovers are examples.  The division derives its name from Shandon, whose bells are a symbol of Cork City.

History
Junior A Football Championship
 2020 Passage West
 2019 St Michael's
 2018 Delanys
 2017 Delanys
 2016 Brian Dillons
 2015 Delanys
 2014 St. Finbarr's
 2013 St. Finbarr's
 2012 Douglas
 2011 St. Finbarr's
 2010	Whites Cross
 2009	Whites Cross
 2008	Whites Cross
 2007	Nemo Rangers
 2006	Whites Cross
 2005	Na Piarsaigh
 2004	Douglas
 2003	Mayfield
 2002	Nemo Rangers
 2001	Mayfield
 2000	Mayfield
 1999	Nemo Rangers
 1998	Brian Dillons
 1997	Mayfield
 1996	Nemo Rangers
 1995	Nemo Rangers
 1994	Passage
 1993	Passage
 1992	Bishopstown
 1991	Brian Dillons
 1990	Nemo Rangers
 1989	Passage
 1988	St. Finbarr's
 1987	St Michael's
 1986	Lough Rovers
 1985	St.Nicks
 1984	St.Nicks
 1983	St.Nicks
 1982	Passage
 1981	St.Nicks
 1980	Passage
 1989	Nemo Rangers
 1978	Brian Dillons
 1977	Brian Dillons
 1976	Delaneys
 1975	Mayfield
 1974	Na Piarsaigh
 1973	Douglas
 1972	St.Nicks
 1971	Bishopstown
 1970	Douglas
 1969	Passage
 1968	Mayfield
 1967	Nemo Rangers
 1966	St.Vincent's
 1965	Na Piarsaigh
 1964	Na Piarsaigh
 1963	Na Piarsaigh
 1962	Douglas
 1961	St. Finbarr's
 1960	St. Finbarr's
 1959	Mayfield
 1958	St.Nicks
 1957	Nemo Rangers
 1956	St Michael's
 1955	Delaneys
 1954	Delaneys
 1953	St Michael's
 1952	St Michael's
 1951	St. Finbarr's
 1950	St.Vincent's
 1949	St.Patrick’s
 1948	Commercials
 1947	St. Finbarr's
 1946	St.Vincent's
 1945	St.Patrick's
 1944	St.Patrick's
 1943	St.Nicks
 1942	Commercials
 1941	St. Finbarr's
 1940	St. Anne's
 1939	St. Anne's
 1938	Brian Dillons
 1937	St. Anne's
 1936	Brian Dillons
 1935	St. Anne's
 1934	St. Anne's
 1933	St. Anne's
 1932	St. Anne's
 1931	St. Anne's
 1930	St.Nicks
 1929	St. Anne's
 1928	Geraldine's
 1927	St. Anne's
 1926	Geraldine's

Achievements
The divisional team has never made a final of either the Cork Senior Football Championship or Cork Senior Hurling Championship. In 1934, 1957, 1959, 1960, 1975 and 1976 it was defeated in the hurling semi-final. The only time it has qualified for a football semi-final was in 1968. Clubs from the division have dominated all grades of Cork club championships.

Member Clubs
 Ballinure
 Ballyphehane
 Bishopstown
 Blackrock
 Brian Dillons
 Delaneys
 Douglas
 Fr. O'Callaghan's
 Glen Rovers
 Gurranabraher
 Lough Rovers
 Mayfield
 Na Piarsaigh
 Nemo Rangers
 Passage West
 Rathpeacon
 Redmonds
 Rochestown
 Shandon Rovers
 St. Finbarr's
 St Michael's
 St. Nicholas
 St. Vincent's
 UCC
 Whitechurch
 Whites Cross

Competitions
 Cork City Junior Football Championship
 Cork City Junior Hurling Championship
 Seandun Cup Football
 Flor McCarthy Cup

Hurling

Grades

Football

Grades

References

External sources
Seandún GAA Website

Gaelic games clubs in County Cork
Gaelic football clubs in County Cork
Hurling clubs in County Cork